The Desprez Opening is a chess opening characterised by the opening move:
1. h4
The opening is named after the French player . Like a number of other rare openings, 1.h4 has some alternate names such as Kádas Opening (after Gabor Kádas, a Hungarian player), Anti-Borg Opening, Samurai Opening and Harry's Opening.

As the Desprez Opening is very rare, it is considered an irregular opening, and is classified under the A00 code in the Encyclopaedia of Chess Openings.

Assessment
The only piece released is the rook, which is usually not developed to h3. In addition, 1.h4 weakens White's . For these reasons, 1.h4 is among the rarest of the twenty possible first moves for White.

Black usually responds by grabbing the centre with 1...d5 or 1...e5, and simple and sound development by 1...Nf6 is also possible. The response 1...g6, however, intending to fianchetto Black's bishop on g7, is rare because White can undermine Black's pawn structure with 2.h5, making 1.h4 seem logical.

Grandmaster David Bronstein once remarked that he knew of a Russian player who always opened 1.h4 and always won. His point was that after 1...e5 2.g3 d5 3.d4 exd4 4.Qxd4 Nc6 5.Qd1 Nf6 6.Nh3! Be7 7.Nf4 0-0 8.Bg2 the f4-knight is well-placed and White has a good position. Black does not have to be so cooperative, however.

See also
 List of chess openings
 List of chess openings named after people
 “The Chess Opening 1 h4” by Edward Winter

References

Bibliography

Chess openings

pl:Nieregularne otwarcie#1.h4 – otwarcie Despreza